The 1959 New Zealand Grand Prix was a motor race held at the Ardmore Circuit on 10 January 1959. The race was held over 75 laps of the 3.2 kilometre circuit for a race distance of 240 kilometres. It was the seventh iteration of the event and was won by Stirling Moss.

Classification

References

New Zealand Grand Prix
Grand Prix
January 1959 sports events in New Zealand